These are the official results of the 4 × 100 metres relay event at the 1988 Summer Olympics in Seoul, South Korea. There were a total number of 29 nations competing.

U.S. team who was defending the gold medal won in Los Angeles was favored to win the event, but fumbled an exchange in a heat and was disqualified.

A French team, including three members of the bronze medal-winning team here, would claim the world record two years later.

Medalists

Records
These were the standing World and Olympic records (in seconds) prior to the 1988 Summer Olympics.

Final

Held on Saturday October 1, 1988

Semifinals
 Heat 1

 Heat 2

Qualifying heats

 Heat 1

 Heat 2

 Heat 3

 Heat 4

See also
 1986 Men's European Championships 4 × 100 m Relay (Stuttgart)
 1987 Men's World Championships 4 × 100 m Relay (Rome)
 1990 Men's European Championships 4 × 100 m Relay (Split)
 1991 Men's World Championships 4 × 100 m Relay (Tokyo)

References

External links
 Official Report
 Results

R
Relay foot races at the Olympics
Men's events at the 1988 Summer Olympics